The Texas Animal Health Commission (TAHC) is a state agency of Texas. Its headquarters are located at 2105 Kramer Lane in Austin. The commission exists to help protect the health of livestock within the state.

The TAHC was founded in 1893 to address the Texas fever tick problem. Today, the TAHC works to protect the health of all Texas livestock, including: cattle, swine, poultry, sheep, goats, equine family animals and exotic livestock.

TAHC also works to keep pests from reoccurring as major livestock health hazards.

Agency headquarters are in Austin. Seven region offices are located across the state so the staff can work more effectively with ranchers, livestock market and slaughter plant personnel, and other livestock industry representatives. Two laboratories provide serological and microbiological diagnostic services for cattle brucellosis, swine brucellosis, and pseudorabies.

References

External links

 Texas Animal Health Commission

Animal Health Commission
1893 establishments in Texas